Shirate is a village located in Walwa Taluka of the Sangli district of Maharashtra, India. There are 614 families residing in the village, with a population of population of 2943, according to the 2011 Census.

Villages in Sangli district

References